Christopher Lee (1922–2015) was an English actor and singer.

Christopher Lee or Chris Lee may also refer to:

Entertainment
Chris Chan Lee, Asian American filmmaker
Chris Lee or Krasp (born 1975), American musician and drummer for downset.
Chris Lee (producer) (born c.1956), film producer and former head of Columbia/TriStar
Chris Lee Chih-cheng (born 1981), Taiwanese model and actor
Chris Lee or Li Yuchun (born 1984), Chinese singer
Chris Lee (Li Yuchun album)
Christopher Lee (Malaysian actor) (born 1971), Malaysian actor and model based in Singapore

Politics
Chris Lee Chun Kit (born 1982), Malaysian politician
Chris Lee (Hawaii politician) (born 1981), Democratic member of the Hawaii Senate and former member of Hawaii House of Representatives
Chris Lee (New York politician) (born 1964), former U.S. congressman from New York and manufacturing executive

Sports
Chris Lee (ice hockey) (born 1980), Canadian hockey defenceman
Chris Lee (referee) (born 1970), National Hockey League referee
Chris Lee (cricketer) (born 1971), New Zealand cricketer
Christopher Lee (soccer) (born 2001), Canadian soccer player
Chris Lee (footballer), English footballer

Other
Christopher Lee (activist) (1964–2012), Asian-American transgender activist and filmmaker from the San Francisco Bay Area
Christopher Lee (businessman), American businessman
Christopher Lee (chef), American chef
Christopher Lee (historian) (1941–2021), writer, historian and broadcaster
Christopher David Lee (born 1947), Australian writer

See also
 Chris Lea, Canadian political activist
 Christian Lee (disambiguation)
 Christine Lee (disambiguation)